Orchitis is inflammation of the testes. It can also involve swelling, pains and frequent infection, particularly of the epididymis, as in epididymitis. The term is from the Ancient Greek ὄρχις meaning "testicle"; same root as orchid.

Signs and symptoms
Symptoms of orchitis are similar to those of testicular torsion. These can include:
 hematospermia (blood in the semen)
 hematuria (blood in the urine)
 severe pain
 visible swelling of a testicle or testicles and often the inguinal lymph nodes on the affected side.

Causes
Orchitis can be related to epididymitis infection that has spread to the testicles (then called "epididymo-orchitis"), sometimes caused by the sexually transmitted diseases chlamydia and gonorrhea.  It has also been reported in cases of males infected with brucellosis. Orchitis can also be seen during active mumps, particularly in adolescent boys.

Ischemic orchitis may result from damage to the blood vessels of the spermatic cord during inguinal herniorrhaphy, and may in the worst event lead to testicular atrophy.

Diagnosis

 Blood – ESR high
 Urine – Cultural & Sensitivity test
 Ultrasound scanning

Treatment
In most cases where orchitis is caused by epididymitis, treatment is an oral antibiotic such as cefalexin or ciprofloxacin until infection clears up. In both causes non-steroidal anti-inflammatory drugs such as naproxen or ibuprofen are recommended to relieve pain. Sometimes stronger pain medications in the opiate category are called for and are frequently prescribed by experienced emergency department physicians.

Other animals 
Orchitis is not rare in bulls and rams. It has also been described in roosters.

References

Further reading

External links

Inflammations
Testicle disorders
Mumps
Men's health